The Dull Ice Flower (literally translated as lupine flower) is a 1989 Taiwanese film based on the novel of the same title by Chung Chao-cheng. Dealing with education and other social issues in rural Taiwan in the deprived 1950s and early 1960s, the story was adapted into a screenplay by Wu Nien-jen.

Synopsis 
Ku A-ming (古阿明) is a fourth grader at Chungshan Elementary School in Shuiyu Township. Despite being not very good in most subjects at school, he is very talented in art and has a great imagination, though most teachers cannot understand what he's expressing in his artwork. During a morning assembly, a new art teacher named Mr. Kuo asks if anyone is interested in joining the after school art club. Ku A-ming was the first one to volunteer. During an art competition, the school teachers voted to decide a winner to represent the school in a nationwide competition; most voted the mayor's son for their own interests. Since A-ming lost, Mr. Kuo protested by quitting his job at the school. Before he leaves, he asked A-ming to give him one of his drawings. Sadly, after Mr. Kuo has left, A-ming dies of liver illness. Mr. Kuo sends A-ming's drawing to a worldwide children's art competition, with A-ming's winning as the champion. The teachers begin to regret for neglecting A-ming's great artistic talent. During A-ming's funeral, A-ming's father burned his son's drawings to commemorate A-ming's passing.

Cast

Awards 
At the 26th annual Golden Horse Film Festival, The Dull Ice Flower was nominated for 6 awards, including Best Feature Film, Best Director, Best Leading Actor, and Best Original Film Score.  It won 2 awards, namely Best Supporting Actress and Best Original Film Song.

References 

1989 films
Taiwanese drama films
Films with screenplays by Wu Nien-jen
Films about education